Minuscule 891 (in the Gregory-Aland numbering), Θε427 (von Soden), is a 14th-century Greek minuscule manuscript of the New Testament on paper, with a commentary. It has not survived in complete condition.

Description 

The codex contains the text of the four Gospels and the Pauline epistles, with a commentary, on 474 paper leaves (size ). The text is written in one column per page, 42 lines per page.

There are no  (titles of chapters) at the top of the pages.
It has not Epistle to the Hebrews.

Text 
The Greek Kurt Aland did not placed in any Category.

It was not examined according to the Claremont Profile Method.

It contains the text of the Pericope Adulterae.

History 

According to C. R. Gregory it was written in the 14th century. Currently the manuscript is dated by the INTF to the 14th century.

Gregory saw it in 1886.

The manuscript was added to the list of New Testament manuscripts by Gregory (891e 318p).
In 1908 Gregory gave the number 891 to it.

It is not cited in critical editions of the Greek New Testament (UBS4, NA28).

Currently the manuscript is housed at the Biblioteca Marciana (Gr. Z. 32 (689)), in Venice.

See also 

 List of New Testament minuscules (1–1000)
 Biblical manuscript
 Textual criticism
 Minuscule 890
 Minuscule 893

References

Further reading 

 A. Michael, Studia evangelica V, Texte und Untersuchungen zur Geschichte der altchristlichen Literaturblatt 103 (Berlin, 1968).

External links 
 

Greek New Testament minuscules
14th-century biblical manuscripts